Hasanabad (also Romanized as Ḩasanābād) is a village in Khandan Rural District, Tarom Sofla District, Qazvin County, Qazvin Province, Iran. At the 2018 census, its population was 172, in 72 families.

References 

Populated places in Qazvin County